Rong Zongjing (September 23, 1873 - 1938) was a Chinese industrialist from Wuxi, Jiangsu. He was the  older brother of Rong Desheng and the uncle of Rong Yiren.  Rong went to Shanghai at the age of fourteen and worked as an apprentice at a native bank.  Rong started his own native bank in 1896 with his father and brother, and then  established a flour milling and textile empire in China that employed tens of thousands of workers.

See also
 Rong Zhai

Further reading 
 
 
 
 

1873 births
1938 deaths
Businesspeople from Wuxi